Kenneth Davis may refer to:

Kenneth Davis (basketball) (born 1948), American Olympic basketball player
Kenneth B. Davis, Dean of the University of Wisconsin Law School
Kenneth C. Davis, American author of educational books
Kenneth Culp Davis (1908–2003), American legal scholar
Kenneth Davis (American football) (born 1962), American football player
Kenneth S. Davis (1912–1999), American historian
Kenneth L. Davis, American medical researcher and President and C.E.O. of Mount Sinai Medical Center in New York City
Kenny Davis (musician) (born 1961), American jazz bassist
Kenny Davis (footballer) (born 1988), English footballer
Kenn Davis (1932–2010), American surrealist and mystery novel writer
Ken Davis (journalist), Emmy-Award-winning television producer, journalist, and author

See also
Ken Davies (disambiguation)